Maria Belakhova (Russian: Мария Андреевна Белахова, 1903–1969) was a Russian writer and educator known for her work in children's literature and education in the Soviet Union, mentorship of many of the country's prominent children's writers, and her own works. She was editor of the Soviet magazine Children's Literature and the head of the national commission for children's literature.

Biography
Maria Belakhova (née Maria Bogoslovskaya) was born in the town of Old Hops near Michurinks, Russia in 1903. A thirteenth child in the family, she left the family to study. For several years she taught in an elementary school, before continuing her studies with a master's degree in child education and literature. Then she worked at the Children's Literature magazine and eventually became its editor. Later, she was elected head of the commission of the national guild of writers for children's literature.

She wrote several books of her own, authored or edited numerous works by other writers, including Samuil Marshak, and mentored many writers.

A school and a street are named after Belakhova in her birth town and a street in the city of Michurinks.

Belakhova was married to Leonid Belakhov, a Soviet general and administrator, and whose name she took.

References

External links
 http://ozonru.com/context/search/?text=белахова
 https://www.amazon.com/s/ref=nb_sb_noss?url=search-alias%3Daps&field-keywords=m.+belakhova&rh=i%3Aaps%2Ck%3Am.+belakhova
 http://cdb-mich.ucoz.ru/news/vospityvajushhaja_nauka_kraevedenie/2011-10-18-74
 http://www.libex.ru/dimg/3bc7c.jpg
 http://www.libex.ru/dimg/37087.jpg
 http://www.libex.ru/dimg/50002.jpg
 http://www.libex.ru/dimg/500f3.jpg
 
 
 
 http://www.top68.ru/study-of-local-lore/na-rodine-ma-belakhovoi-1229
 http://www.top68.ru/study-of-local-lore/rodom-iz-khmelevogo-4161



1903 births
1969 deaths
Russian educators
Soviet writers
Soviet educators
Russian women writers
20th-century women writers
20th-century Russian writers
20th-century Russian educators
20th-century Russian women